Coleophora kononenkoi is a moth of the family Coleophoridae that is endemic to Korea.

References

External links

kononenkoi
Endemic fauna of Korea
Moths of Asia
Moths described in 2002